One of Those Nights: The Anthology is a greatest hits collection by UFO, released in 2006. It is a 2 disc album, with disc 2 featuring a collection of tracks performed live. This material basically consists of their three albums: High Stakes & Dangerous Men, Live in Texas, and half of the tracks from Lights Out in Tokyo.

Track listing

Disc one

"Borderline" – 5:20
"Primed for Time" – 3:24
"She's the One" – 3:46
"Ain't Life Sweet" – 3:44
"Don't Want to Lose You" – 5:38
"Burnin' Fire" – 4:04
"Running Up the Highway" – 4:41
"Back Door Man" – 5:08
"One of Those Nights" – 4:12
"Revolution" – 4:08
"Love Deadly Love – 4:55
"Let the Good Times Roll" – 4:16
"Long Gone" (Re-recorded Single B-Side) – 4:52

Disc two

"Electric Phase" (Live) – 3:07
"Hot N' Ready" (Live) – 4:06
"Pack It Up and Go" (Live) – 3:24
"Cherry" (Live) – 4:15
"Out in the Street" (Live) – 5:46
"Let It Roll" (Live) – 5:05
"Too Hot to Handle" (Live) – 4:47
"Borderline" (Live) – 5:35
"She's the One" (Live) – 3:25
"Back Door Man" (Live) – 5:24
"Love to Love" (Live) – 8:12
"Only You Can Rock Me" (Live) – 4:08
"Lights Out" (Live) – 6:32
"Doctor Doctor" (Live) – 8:17
"Shoot Shoot" (Live) – 4:41

Notes

2006 compilation albums
2006 live albums
UFO (band) compilation albums